This is the list of awards and nominations received by South Korean boy group BtoB since their debut in 2012.


Awards and nominations

Other accolades

State and cultural honors

Notes

References

BtoB
A